The 2012 Mississippi State Bulldogs baseball team represented Mississippi State University in the NCAA Division I baseball season of 2012.  The team was coached by John Cohen, in his 13th year as a collegiate head coach, and his 4th at Mississippi State.

Mississippi State wins the 2012 SEC Tournament Championship winning a school record 5 games against 1 loss, is then eliminated in the NCAA Tournament in the Tallahassee Regional, and finishes ranked in some polls.

Pre-season
The 2012 Mississippi State Bulldogs Baseball team was looking to continue rebuilding after the 2011 MSU Baseball team had a winning record and returned to the NCAA Tournament, both for the first time in 4 years. The 2012 MSU baseball team welcomes a recruiting class ranked 14th by Baseball America, which is the third consecutive top 20 ranked recruiting class.

The SEC coaches pick this team to finish 5th in the West division. The team is not ranked in the top 25 in any of the four major preseason polls. The team went on to finish tied for 2nd in the SEC West, to win the SEC Tournament and at one point is ranked as high as 14th.

Senior RHP Caleb Reed is selected 1st team NCBWA Preseason All-American. Reed is also selected 1st team SEC Preseason All-Conference by College Sports Madness, while sophomore OF C.T. Bradford, and sophomore SS Adam Frazier are selected 2nd team.

Regular season
Going 4–0 to open the season, they were ranked 18th on February 27, 2012, by Perfect Game. They will end the regular season ranked as high as 21st (See Ranking Movements below).

Mississippi State entered the final series of the regular season at 31–21, 13–14 in conference play. In that final series, they swept, at that time, #2 Kentucky, at home, in Starkville, to finish the regular season 34–21, 16–14. For the regular season, they won all five conference series at home, including a sweep of Tennessee in addition to Kentucky, and lost all five series on the road, including being swept by South Carolina.

Games Schedule, results, and box scores can be found at the reference.

SEC Tournament
In the SEC Tournament, with all rankings according to the final Coaches' Poll, Mississippi State beat #3 Arkansas then #11 LSU, before losing to #19 Kentucky; they then beat #11 LSU, again, #19 Kentucky, winning the rematch, and #25 Vanderbilt to win the SEC Tournament Championship. SS Adam Frazier is the Tournament MVP. Frazier, OF Demarcus Henderson, and P Jonathan Holder make the All-Tournament team. Frazier, in 6 games, hits 0.522 with one double, has an OBP of 0.560, scores 4 runs, has 3 rbi, and successfully hits a sacrifice bunt. Holder, in 4 games, has 3 saves and 1 win, giving up 0 runs.

In the championship game Mississippi State beats Vanderbilt, shutting them out 3–0. Pitchers Brandon Woodruff, Ross Mitchell, Caleb Reed, and Chris Stratton combine for the shutout.

After, going 5–1 in, and winning the SEC Tournament, at 39–22 overall, they are ranked as high as 14th by Baseball America.

NCAA tournament
In the NCAA Tournament, Mississippi State is regionally seeded 2nd, in the Tallahassee Regional. They lose in an upset to 3rd seed Samford, then win to eliminate 4th seed UAB, and then lose to be eliminated by 3rd seed Samford. In the losing effort, four Mississippi State players make the 11 man,  Regional All-Tournament team, Matthew Britton (FR 2B), Adam Frazier (SO SS), Wes Rea (FR 1B), and Mitch Slauter (JR C).

After the post season ends, going 1–2 in the NCAA Tournament, they are ranked as high as 22nd by Baseball America.

Season Awards
RHP Kendall Graveman is the first Mississippi State player to be named to this team, since the conference started this all-defensive team in 2008. He only committed 1 error in 89.2 innings pitched.
SEC Coaches' All-Defensive Team.
RHP Jonathan Holder saw limited action as a true freshman, in 2012. He did lose the game, in relief, to eliminate Mississippi State from the NCAA Tournament. But at one point, he set a school record scoreless streak at 27.1 innings, which was his entire start to the season. Overall, he had an ERA of 0.32, 30 strikeouts, and 5 base-on-balls, in 28.1 innings. The only runs given up were 2 runs, 1 earned, in 1.0 inning pitched, in the NCAA Regional elimination game. Overall, he went 2–1 with 9 saves. In the last 11 games, in which he appeared, he had 8 saves and went 1–1.
SEC Coaches' All-Freshman Team.
NCBWA Freshman All-American Team.
Collegiate Baseball Freshman All-American.
Baseball America's Louisville Slugger Freshmen All-American Team.
Perfect Game Freshman All-American.
RHP Chris Stratton went 11–2 with a 2.38 ERA with 127 strikeouts and 25 base-on-balls in 109.2 innings. He was the first Consensus All-American for Mississippi State since Will Clark in 1985.
C Spire Ferris Trophy for the best college baseball player in the state of Mississippi.
Southeastern Conference Baseball Pitcher of the Year.
Consensus All-American.
American Baseball Coaches Association All-American
Baseball America All-American
Collegiate Baseball All-American
National Collegiate Baseball Writers Association All-American

MLB Draft
 NOTE: Kendall Graveman will not sign, finishes his senior year at Mississippi State and then goes in the 8th round the next year.

Ranking movements

Notes: The Coaches' and Baseball America had no rankings for week 16 and 17, June 5 and June 11; the Final rank is used.

Roster and Stats

Coaches

Players

NOTE: The use of 99. and ² have no significance other than to maintain Totals and Opponents at the bottom when sorted ascending for those columns.

Pitchers

NOTE: The use of 99. and ² have no significance other than to maintain Totals and Opponents at the bottom when sorted ascending for those columns.

Players Not Played
These players were on the roster, but did not appear in a game, and may have been redshirted or left the program.

Schedule and results

References 

Mississippi State Bulldogs Baseball Team, 2012
Mississippi State Bulldogs baseball seasons
Miss